"Beers on Me" is a song recorded by American country music singers Dierks Bentley, Breland, and Hardy. It was released on July 29, 2021 as the second of two "Covid holdover songs".
The song was co-written by Ashley Gorley, Luke Dick, Ross Copperman, Breland, Hardy and Bentley, who also produced the track with Copperman.

Background
Bentley and Hardy created the song during the recuperation in Colorado, then Bentley completed the tune with Breland in Nashville. Bentley shared the process in a press: “Hardy threw out this title, and I remember immediately thinking, ‘I wish I could buy all my fans a beer.’ After the year we’ve all had, it would be nice to get the first round and say, ‘Hey, we all have some problems, but we’re going to forget about them for a little while…the beers are on me, I came back to Nashville to record the song and came across an article about Breland in the Nashville Scene. I got his number, and he came in the next day and wrote and sang the third verse. It was truly an organic collaboration, and I couldn’t be more proud to have him and Hardy on this song with me.”

Content
"Beers on Me" is about friends meeting at a bar to consume alcohol together.

Music video
The music video was released on October 27, 2021, and starred by the three artists. It features all three artists as they drive a truck loaded with boxes of beer around Nashville, and "hand out free beer to unsuspecting people", the locations including "a poolside party, a dog park, a street basketball court and Bentley's own Whiskey Row bar."

Live performance
Bentley, Breland and Hardy performed the track from Whiskey Row in Nashville for the first time.

Commercial performance
"Beers On Me" peaked at number one on the country charts in April 2022 (Billboard). It became Dierks 18th, Hardy's second as well as Brelands first.

Personnel
Credits by AllMusic

Dierks Bentley - lead vocals
Breland - featured vocals
Ross Copperman - acoustic guitar, electric guitar, keyboards, programming, background vocals
Luke Dick - electric guitar
Hardy - featured vocals
Tony Lucido - bass guitar
Danny Rader - acoustic guitar, electric guitar, keyboards, programming
Aaron Sterling - drums

Charts

Weekly charts

Year-end charts

Certifications

References

2021 singles
2021 songs
Dierks Bentley songs
Hardy (singer) songs
Capitol Records Nashville singles
Songs written by Dierks Bentley
Songs written by Luke Dick
Songs written by Ashley Gorley
Songs written by Ross Copperman
Songs written by Hardy (singer)
Breland (musician) songs
Vocal collaborations
Songs written by Breland (musician)